Richard Duckworth (6 June 1906 – 9 April 1983) was an English football player and manager.

Playing career
Duckworth was a utility player and began his career with Castleton Juniors, subsequently moving on to Rochdale, Manchester United, Oldham Athletic, Chesterfield, Southport, Chester, Rotherham United and York City. At York, he was captain when the team reached the sixth round of the FA Cup.

Managerial career
Duckworth began his managerial career as player-manager with non-league Newark Town. After working as a coach with Chesterfield, he moved to manage York City in March 1950. His last game as York's manager was against Stockport County on 18 October 1952, who he had agreed to join three days earlier, and took up their managerial duties following the game. After four years with the club, he joined Darlington and later Scunthorpe United. During his time at Scunthorpe he steered the club to its highest-ever league finish of 4th in Division Two in 1962. However, the club were relegated two years later, and Duckworth was sacked after a bad start to the following season. It proved to be his last role in club management.

He died in Sheffield in 1983, aged 76.

Family
Duckworth was the son of professional footballer Dick Duckworth, who spent the majority of his career with Manchester United, and the nephew of fellow professional Dick Crawshaw, who played in the Football League with Manchester City, Halifax Town and Nelson.

Honours

As a player 
Chesterfield
Third Division (North) Title winner: 1930–31

Chester City
Welsh Cup winner: 1933

As a manager 
Stockport County
Cheshire Bowl winner: 1952–53, 1955–56

Managerial statistics

Notes

External links

1906 births
People from Harpurhey
1983 deaths
English footballers
Association football fullbacks
Rochdale A.F.C. players
Manchester United F.C. players
Oldham Athletic A.F.C. players
Chesterfield F.C. players
Southport F.C. players
Chester City F.C. players
Rotherham United F.C. players
York City F.C. players
Newark Town F.C. players
English Football League players
English football managers
York City F.C. managers
Stockport County F.C. managers
Darlington F.C. managers
Scunthorpe United F.C. managers
English Football League managers
Sheffield United F.C. non-playing staff